Avernum: Escape from the Pit is a single-player role-playing video game developed by Spiderweb Software. It is the first game in the remade Avernum First Trilogy and the second ground-up rewrite of Exile: Escape from the Pit, released in 1995 (the first rewrite was Avernum, released in 2000). The game was re-released as a graphics and game engine update, as well as addressing Avernum 1-3 incompatibilities with newer versions of Mac OS X 10.7 Lion and newer.

The game was released for Mac OS X on December 14, 2011, A release date of April 2012 has been announced for Microsoft Windows and the iPad. and later for Valve's Steam on April 11, 2012.

Plot
The Avernum series is based in Avernum, a subterranean nation far under the surface of the world. The surface is ruled by the Empire, a single, monolithic power under the command of the cruel Emperor Hawthorne.

Everyone on the surface who speaks out, rebels, or doesn't fit in is sentenced to life imprisonment in Avernum. Prisoners are expected to die, the victim of starvation, horrible monsters, or simple despair.

The Avernum series tells the tale of the Avernites' struggle to survive, avenge themselves upon the Empire, and win both freedom and a return to the surface world.

Gameplay

Avernum: Escape from the Pit is a single-player role-playing video game. The player controls a group of up to four adventurers, who can use melee weapons, missile weapons, magic, or a mix of these skills to defeat opponents.

The game system in Avernum is skill based. Characters choose a character class at the beginning of the game, but this only determines the character's starting skills. The player is then free to train the character in different skills.

Characters in Avernum have access to 52 different spells and battle disciplines. These can be spells to inflict damage or summon aid, blessings and curses, and rituals that heal wounded party members. Avernum features elaborate scripted encounters that are intended to encourage a variety of tactics.

Avernum features a large world and great freedom in what areas to explore and when. Game quests can be completed in almost any order.

The combat is turn-based with an isometric perspective, where creatures in battle take turns acting, during which they can move, use abilities, and attack.

Reception

References

External links
 

Android (operating system) games
Role-playing video games
Fantasy video games
IOS games
MacOS games
Spiderweb Software games
Video game remakes
Video games developed in the United States
Video games with isometric graphics
Windows games
2011 video games
Single-player video games